Fundo de Investimento em Direitos Creditórios (FIDC) is a financial instrument widely used in Brazilian credit markets and has been traded frequently by international investors and hedge funds.
A FIDC is a type of fund composed of receivables (direitos creditórios) from different types of issuers. 
Mostly Brazilian banks lend to individuals or companies, pack these receivables in the format of an FIDC fund and sell to the public.
Many of these funds are created with assets with tranches, where the bank keeps the equity tranche, or the first defaults, and thus the credit rating of the FIDC is better than that of the original loan.
The majority of FIDC in the market today come from loans to public and private pension beneficiaries (guaranteed by the pension plans), real estate receivables and not so often credit card receivables.

Sources 

Moodys International Credit Agency

The Brazilian Securitization Market: A Primer - Special Report

References 

Financial markets
Finance in Brazil